In enzymology, a 6β-hydroxyhyoscyamine epoxidase is an enzyme that catalyzes the chemical reaction

(6S)-6-hydroxyhyoscyamine + 2-oxoglutarate + O2  scopolamine + succinate + CO2 + H2O

The 3 substrates of this enzyme are (6S)-6-hydroxyhyoscyamine, 2-oxoglutarate, and O2, whereas its 4 products are scopolamine, succinate, CO2, and H2O.

This enzyme belongs to the family of oxidoreductases, specifically those acting on paired donors, with O2 as oxidant and incorporation or reduction of oxygen. The oxygen incorporated need not be derived from O2 with 2-oxoglutarate as one donor, and incorporation of one atom of oxygen into each donor. This enzyme participates in alkaloid biosynthesis ii. It has two cofactors: iron  and ascorbate.

Nomenclature
The systematic name of this enzyme class is (6S)-6-hydroxyhyoscyamine,2-oxoglutarate oxidoreductase (epoxide-forming). This enzyme is also called hydroxyhyoscyamine dioxygenase.

References

 

EC 1.14.11
Iron enzymes
Ascorbate enzymes
Enzymes of unknown structure